WHEC may refer to:

USCG High Endurance Cutter, one of three classes of U.S. Coast Guard vessel
WHEC-TV, Rochester, NY
Wester Hailes Education Centre, a secondary school and leisure centre in Edinburgh, Scotland